Arnoldi is a surname. Notable people with the surname include:

 Bartholomaeus Arnoldi (1465–1532), an Augustinian friar associated with Martin Luther
 Charles Arnoldi (born 1946), an American painter, sculptor and printmaker
 Per Arnoldi (born 1941), a Danish designer and artist
 Vladimir Arnoldi (1871–1924), a Russian writer of children's books and professor of biology
 Walter Edwin Arnoldi (1917–1995), an American engineer known for the Arnoldi iteration

See also

 
 
 Arnoldi iteration, an algorithm in algebra 
 Paa arnoldi, a species of frog

German-language surnames